Chengalpattu Junction railway station is a railway junction of the southern section of the Chennai Suburban Railway Network situated in the town of Chengalpattu,  south-west of . The station falls in the Chennai railway division of the Southern Railway zone of the Indian Railways. Officially it bears the code CGL.

History

The lines at the station were electrified on 9 January 1965, with the electrification of the Tambaram—Chengalpattu section.

Location and Layout
The Chengalpattu train station is located at the heart of the Chengalpattu city, on the banks of the Kolavai Lake. It is situated on the SH-58, and opposite to its main entrance lies the TNSTC and Mofussil bus terminals. There is also a statue in the memory of Periyar outside the train station.

The station is a part of the Chennai–Villupuram line and another line, the Arakkonam–Chengalpattu line.

The nearest airport from the station is the Chennai International Airport located at a distance of nearly 42 kilometres from the city.

Traffic
The Chengalpattu Junction being a focal point on the Chennai–Villupuram line, inevitably means that every south-bound train from Chennai has to operate via the junction thus making it one of the most crowded railway stations of the Indian Railways.

There also several suburban trains operating from and through the station towards Chennai and the station holds prime importance in the South and South-west lines of the Chennai Suburban Railway.

See also

 Chennai Suburban Railway

References

Chennai railway division
Railway stations in Kanchipuram district
Stations of Chennai Suburban Railway
Railway junction stations in Tamil Nadu